Chandragomin (Skt. Candragomin) was an Indian Buddhist lay scholar and poet from the Varendra region of Eastern Bengal. The Tibetan tradition believes challenged Chandrakirti. According to the Nepalese tradition, Chandragomin's student was Ratnakīrti. Chandragomin was a teacher at Nalanda Monastic University during the 5th century.   It is unclear when Chandragomin lived, with estimates ranging between 5th to 6th-century CE, but his position at Nalanda signifies he lived during the 5th century.

In the Buddhist records, Chandragomin is described as the one who debated Candrakīrti (Devanagari: चन्द्रकीर्ति, Tib. Dawa Drakpa) the Arya Tripitaka Master Shramana who was the Khenpo at Nalanda Mahāvihāra Monastery. Their debate was said to have continued for many years. Chandragomin held the Chittamatra (consciousness-only or Yogachara) view, and Chandrakirti gave his interpretation of Nāgārjuna's view, eventually creating a new school of Madhyamaka known as Prasangika.

According to Thrangu Rinpoche, Chandragomin was slow in the debate but always had the right answers because each time a question was posed by Chandrakirti, Chandragomin would insist on giving the answer the next day after praying to Avalokiteshvara who would tell him the right answer.

The description of Nalanda Monastery's seven-year debate between Candrakīrti and Candragomin should be Tāranātha's biggest academic mistake in his life. It is believed that with his erudition, he should have read the Commentary on "Mañjuśrī-Nāma-Saṃgīti" of Candragomin for sure. In the 135th verse of the commentary, it is an analysis of the Mādhyamaka and Yogācāra of the Mahāyāna schools. It should not be difficult for Tāranātha to conclude that Candragomin is a Mādhyamika according to Candragomin's commentary on the 135th verse of "Mañjuśrī-Nāma-Saṃgīti".  The seven-year debate between Candragomin and Candrakīrti is not a debate between Mādhyamaka and Yogācāra school, but a debate on the nuanced differences of view of the Mādhyamaka school.

Major works

 Chadragomin's writings include Shisyalekha or 'Letter to a Disciple' (published by Dharma Publishing as 'Invitation to Enlightenment' )
 'Twenty Verses on the Bodhisattva Vow'.
 Translated from the original Buddhist Hybrid Sanskrit into Tibetan is Chandragomin's 'Shurangama Mantra Sadhana' (Tibetan canon Tengyur Karchag Phangthangma Toh 3096, Toh 593/2/1). It is titled Sarvatathāgataoṣṇīṣaśitātapatrā-nāmāparājitā-mahāpratyangirā-mahāvidyārājñī-nāma-dhāraṇī; Tibetan name is ['phags pa] De bshin gshegs pa'i gtsug tor nas byung ba'i gdugs dkar po can gshan gyi mi thub pa phir bzlog pa chen mo mchog tu grub pa shes bya ba'i gzungs.

Quote

Praise in Confession (http://www.bodhicitta.net/Chandragomin%27s%20Praises.htm)

See also
Chandrakirti
Nagarjuna
Shurangama Mantra

References

Further reading

Geshe Sonam Rinchen, The Bodhisattva Vow, translated and edited by Ruth Sonam, Snow Lion, 2000
Candragomin, Difficult Beginnings: Three Works on the Bodhisattva Path, translated, with commentary by Mark Tatz, Shambhala, 1985
Chandragomin - Praise in Confession

External links
Candrakiirti's critique of Vijñaanavaada, Robert F. Olson, Philosophy East and West, Volume 24 No. 4, 1977, pp. 405–411
Candrakiirti's denial of the self, James Duerlinger, Philosophy East and West, Volume 34 No. 3, July 1984, pp. 261–272
Candrakiirti's refutation of Buddhist idealism, Peter G. Fenner, Philosophy East and West, Volume 33 No. 3, July 1983, pp. 251–261

Indian scholars of Buddhism
Madhyamaka scholars
Mahayana Buddhism writers
Monks of Nalanda
Tibetan Buddhist spiritual teachers
7th-century Indian philosophers
7th-century Indian writers